Sergei Zuborev (born April 7, 1983) is a Russian professional ice hockey player who plays for Vityaz Chekhov of the Kontinental Hockey League (KHL).

External links

1983 births
Living people
Russian ice hockey defencemen
HC Vityaz players
Universiade medalists in ice hockey
Universiade gold medalists for Russia
Competitors at the 2011 Winter Universiade